The black-capped siskin (Spinus atriceps) is a species of finch in the family Fringillidae. It is found in Mexico and Guatemala. Its natural habitats are subtropical or tropical moist montane forest and heavily degraded former forest.

Phylogeny
It has been obtained by Antonio Arnaiz-Villena et al.

Identification
Spinus atriceps has been defined as a finch with a gray wash and a black cap. However, other green morphs have been also identified with Spinus atriceps, but apparently they are pine siskin (S. pinus) green morphs.

References

black-capped siskin
Birds of Mexico
Birds of Guatemala
black-capped siskin
black-capped siskin
Taxonomy articles created by Polbot